Gabriel Lima De Oliveira (born 19 August 1987), is a Brazilian born, Italian futsal player who plays for  Acqua e Sapone Calcioa a 5 and the Italian national futsal team.

References

External links
UEFA profile

1987 births
Living people
Italian men's futsal players
ElPozo Murcia FS players
Brazilian emigrants to Italy
Marca Futsal players